The Wihtwara were one of the tribes of Anglo-Saxon Britain. Their territory was a tribal kingdom located on the Isle of Wight before it was conquered by the Kingdom of Wessex in the late seventh century. The tribe's name is preserved in the name of the eponymous island.

Etymology

The origin of the root Wiht is uncertain though it likely derives from gweiθ, a proto-Brythonic word for “fortification, earthwork or fort.”   The suffix -wara is the genitive plural of the Old English noun waru, which means "those that care for, watch, guard, protect, or defend." The literal translation of Whitwara is thus the two nouns “fort-guards".

Origins

The Wihtwara were Jutes, an amalgam of Cimbri, Teutons, Gutones and Charudes called Eudoses, Eotenas, Iutae or Euthiones in other sources. This ethnic distinction was recorded by Bede in his Ecclesiastical History of the English People in the early eight century:

Attributions to Wihtgar and Stuf as the earliest kings are examples of non-historical founding myths and have been disproven by archaeology.

History

Settlement patterns on the island - known as Vectis - suggest the prosperity of local agriculture based on the villa system during the Roman era. Exports of hides, slaves, hunting dogs, grain, cattle, silver, gold, and iron were made from a port at Brading until the collapse of Roman authority during the Great Conspiracy of 367-368 AD.

There is some indication of a small Geatish kingdom emerging on the island, likely called the Kingdom of Vectis. Archaeology has confirmed Germanic burials at Bowcombe and Gatcombe that took place at least 50 years before the dates suggested by historical sources, concurrent with Honorius's award of land in Gallia Aquitania to the Visigoths in 418 AD. They in turn appear to have occupied and/or fortified nearby Carisbrooke and within the next few decades established colonies across the Solent on the mainland. Circa 476 AD a Geatish component appears on the island and in Hampshire. 

Across the English Channel there was a short-lived attempt to maintain a Romano-Germanic political structure in the region prior to the coming of the Franks. The Kingdom of Soissons - Regnum Romanorum - occupied northern Gaul from 457–486 AD while the Visigothic Kingdom - Regnum Gothorum, also known as the Kingdom of Toulouse - occupied  southern Gaul from 418-507 AD. This arrangement fell to Frankish power with the Battle of Soissons and the Battle of Vouillé at the end of the fifth and beginning of the sixth centuries, respectively. The fledgling Kingdom of Vectis was isolated as a result.

Aside from the mythical kings of Anglo-Saxon Chronicle, no kings of the Whitwara are known save the final one. Arwald was reportedly killed resisting an invasion in 686 AD by King Caedwalla of Wessex. He appears to have been a real historical figure, and the stories of his sons escaping to the Great Ytene Forest at New Forest only to be betrayed and put to death have the ring of historical truth. The genealogies serve a political purpose and are probably interpolations.

The rise of the Kingdom of Wessex seems to be linked with the decline of Visigothic authority after 517 AD, with the West Saxons taking advantage of their losses in Gaul to the emerging Frankish Empire. In the late 680s AD the West Saxons moved southward and absorbed the Jutish lands in Hampshire and the Isle of Wight. The former seemed to be a relatively peaceful affair while the latter was particularly brutal. The subsequent establishment of the very large trading settlement at Hamwic suggests that control over the Solent was the motivating factor in the conquest of the Jutish folklands.

Notes

References

Peoples of Anglo-Saxon England
Jutish people
History of the Isle of Wight
Former kingdoms